Ścinawka Dolna  is a village in the administrative district of Gmina Radków, within Kłodzko County, Lower Silesian Voivodeship, in south-western Poland.

People 
 Emanuel Aloys Förster

References 

Villages in Kłodzko County